William Robert Gordon (born 7 August 1965) is a former New Zealand rugby union player. A loose forward, where he could play either blind side flanker or No. 8. Gordon represented Otago and Waikato at a provincial level. He was a member of the New Zealand national side, the All Blacks, in 1990 on the tour on France, during which he played three matches but no tests. He also appeared in a  New Zealand XV in 1991 playing unofficial tests against Russia, an Australian XV and Romania. He also holds the New Zealand and World records for the most tries (5) scored by a forward in a national championship rugby match. This outstanding and unique world record still stands today. Between 1997 and 1999, when working and playing rugby for Toshiba in Tokyo, Japan he played 17 test matches for Japan, including three test matches at the 1999 Rugby World Cup.

References

1965 births
Living people
New Zealand rugby union players
New Zealand international rugby union players
Expatriate rugby union players in Japan
New Zealand expatriate sportspeople in Japan
Japan international rugby union players
Toshiba Brave Lupus Tokyo players
People from Te Awamutu
Rugby union players from Waikato
People educated at Te Awamutu College